Johann Schobert (c. 1720, 1735 or 1740 – 28 August 1767) was a composer and harpsichordist. His date of birth is given variously as about 1720, about 1735, or about 1740, his place of birth as Silesia, Alsace, or Nuremberg. He died after eating poisonous mushrooms that he insisted were edible.

Career

In 1760 or 1761, Schobert moved to Paris where he served in the household of Louis François I de Bourbon, prince de Conti. He composed many books of sonatas for his instrument, most of them with an accompanying part for one or more other instruments. Schobert also wrote harpsichord concertos, symphonies and the opéra comique Le Garde-Chasse et le Braconnier.

In Paris, Schobert came into contact with Leopold Mozart during the family's grand tour. Reportedly, Schobert was offended by Mozart's comments that his children played Schobert's works with ease. Nevertheless, Schobert was a significant influence on the young Wolfgang Amadeus Mozart, who arranged a number of movements from Schobert's sonatas for use in his own piano concertos.

Mozart biographer Dyneley Hussey writes that it was Schobert's music that opened up Mozart to the possibility of adopting a poetic stance in his music. Citing Téodor de Wyzewa and Georges de Saint-Foix's work on Mozart, Hussey points out that the four piano concertos, "which are deliberate studies from Schobert", have a "typically Mozartian" stylized nature which is actually present in the Schobert works that he was emulating. Hussey concludes, "So we may regard Schobert, to whom Wolfgang owes so much of the 'romantic' element which appears in his work alongside of its 'classic' grace and vigor, as being the first of his real masters."

In 1767, Schobert went mushroom picking with his family in Le Pré-Saint-Gervais near Paris. He tried to have a local chef prepare them, but was told they were poisonous. After unsuccessfully trying again at a restaurant at Bois de Boulogne, and being incorrectly told by a doctor acquaintance of his that the mushrooms were edible, he decided to use them to make a soup at home. Schobert, his wife, all but one of their children, and his doctor friend died.

Works
op. 1 – 2 Sonatas for Harpsichord, Violine ad libitum
op. 2 – 2 Sonatas for Harpsichord, with violin obbligato
op. 3 – 2 Sonatas for Harpsichord, Violin ad libitum
op. 4 – 2 Sonatas for Harpsichord
op. 5 – 2 Sonatas for Harpsichord, Violin ad libitum
op. 6 – 3 Triosonatas for Harpsichord, Violin and Violoncello ad libitum
op. 7 – 3 Sonatas en quatuor, Harpsichord, 2 Violins and Violoncello ad libitum
op. 8 – 2 Sonatas for Harpsichord with Violin obbligato
op. 9 – 3 Sinfonies for Harpsichord, Violine and 2 Horns ad libitum
op. 10 – 3 Sinfonies for Harpsichord, Violin and 2 Horns ad libitum
op. 11 – Concerto I for Harpsichord, 2 Violins, Viola, Violoncello, 2 Horns ad libitum
op. 12 – Concerto II for Harpsichord, 2 Violins, Viola, Violoncello, 2 Oboes, 2 Horns ad libitum
op. 13 – Concerto III pastorale for Harpsichord, 2 Violins, 2 Horns ad libitum, Viola, Violoncello
op. 14 – 6 Sonatas for Harpsichord, Violine ad libitum (Nr. 1 with Violin and Viola ad libitum)
op. 15 – Concerto IV for Harpsichord, Violine and 2 Horns ad libitum
op. 16 – 4 Sonatas for Harpsichord, Violin and Violoncello
op. 17 – 4 Sonatas for Harpsichord, Violin
op. 18 – Concerto V for Harpsichord and 2 Violins
op. 19 – 2 Sonatas for Harpsichord or Pianoforte, Violin (posthumous)
op. 20 – 3 Sonatas for Harpsichord and Violin (probably by T. Giordani)

(New Grove Dictionary of Music and Musicians)

Sources
Article on Johann Schobert in the German Wikipedia
Article on Johann Schobert in the French Wikipedia
The Grove Concise Dictionary of Music, Oxford University Press 1994.
Herbert C. Turrentine. "Schobert, Johann." Grove Music Online. Oxford Music Online. Oxford University Press, accessed November 7, 2013, http://www.oxfordmusiconline.com/subscriber/article/grove/music/25017.

References

External links

18th-century births
1767 deaths
German harpsichordists
German opera composers
Male opera composers
Deaths from food poisoning
German Classical-period composers
Accidental deaths in France
18th-century classical composers
18th-century keyboardists
German male classical composers
18th-century German composers
18th-century German male musicians